Habte Jifar (born January 29, 1976 in Ambo, Ethiopia) is an Ethiopian middle distance runner. He has a total of three medals in the All-African Games. His best performance in a global event was a sixth place at the 1999 World Championships. He currently specializes in the marathon race.Now at this time he lives in America, and he has three daughters and a lovely wife. He also achieved so many medals.

Achievements

External links 
 

1976 births
Living people
Ethiopian male long-distance runners
Ethiopian male middle-distance runners
African Games silver medalists for Ethiopia
African Games medalists in athletics (track and field)
African Games bronze medalists for Ethiopia
Athletes (track and field) at the 1995 All-Africa Games
Athletes (track and field) at the 1999 All-Africa Games
20th-century Ethiopian people
21st-century Ethiopian people